Nowra Hill is a suburb of Nowra in the City of Shoalhaven in New South Wales, Australia. It lies southwest of Nowra on the western side of the Princes Highway. HMAS Albatross is located on the western edge of the suburb.

References

City of Shoalhaven